Brennero may refer to:

 Brenner, South Tyrol, a municipality in Italy
 Brenner Pass